Le Houérou, Le Huérou, Le Huërou or Le Houërff is a surname of Breton origin.

Le Houérou as written in the Catholicon derives from c'hwerv which means bitter in Breton.

Notable people with this surname
 Annie Le Houérou, French MP and mayor of Guingamp.
 Cathy Le Houérou, French basketball player who played for Pays d'Aix Basket 13, Pleyber-Christ, Saint-Brieuc 
 Henri-Noël Le Houérou, French biologist, plant collector and specialist of North African ecosystems, recipient of the Order of Agricultural Merit in 1991
 Joël Le Houérou, French badminton player who won the 1963 French National Badminton Championships with Yves Corbel and Vice-champion of France veterans in 1986 with Christian Badou
 Philippe Le Houérou, Vice President for the World Bank’s South Asia Region
 Pierre-Paul Le Houérou, vicar of Saint-Eutrope (Plougonven) in 1791 who refused to take the oath of fidelity to the Civil Constitution of the Clergy
 Jean Kérisel (born Jean Lehuérou Kérisel), French engineer and Egyptologist.

References

External links

 Registres paroissiaux et d'état civil (Image 129) from the Archives départementales des Côtes d'Armor
 Le Huérou Kerisel Familyl on GeneaNet

Breton-language surnames